Peredel is a rural locality (a settlement) in Muromtsevskoye Rural Settlement, Sudogodsky District, Vladimir Oblast, Russia. The population was 153 as of 2010. There are 8 streets.

Geography 
Peredel is located 13 km southeast of Sudogda (the district's administrative centre) by road. Peredel (village) is the nearest rural locality.

References 

Rural localities in Sudogodsky District